The 2015–16 Texas–Rio Grande Valley Vaqueros men's basketball team represented the University of Texas Rio Grande Valley during the 2015–16 NCAA Division I men's basketball season. This was head coach Dan Hipsher's third season with the UTRGV program, although his first under the "UTRGV" name. The Vaqueros played their home games at the UTRGV Fieldhouse on the university's campus in Edinburg, Texas and were members of the Western Athletic Conference. They finished the season 8–22, 4–10 in WAC play to finish in a tie for sixth place. They lost in the quarterfinals of the WAC tournament to Seattle.

This was the first season as an institution for UTRGV, which was formed in a consolidation between University of Texas-Pan American (UTPA) and the University of Texas at Brownsville. The former UTPA athletic program was converted to that of UTRGV, with UTPA's conference membership and athletic history transferring directly to the new institution.

On March 15, 2016, the school removed Dan Hipsher as head coach. On March 31, the school hired Lew Hill as head coach.

Previous season 
The Texas-Pan American Broncs finished the 2014–15 season 10–21, 4–10 in WAC play to finish in a tie for seventh place. They lost in the quarterfinals of the WAC tournament to UMKC.

Departures

Incoming transfers

2015 incoming recruits

Roster

Schedule and results 

For the first time in club history, every home game will be televised. UTRGV has entered into a deal with TWCS Texas to broadcast all 13 home games. Every home game, unless it becomes a WAC DN exclusive, will air on the network.

|-
!colspan=9 style="background:#; color:white;"| Exhibition

|-
!colspan=9 style="background:#; color:white;"| Non-conference regular season

|-
!colspan=9 style="background:#; color:white;"| WAC Conference Play

|-
!colspan=9 style="background:#; color:white;"| WAC tournament

See also 
2015–16 Texas–Rio Grande Valley Vaqueros women's basketball team

References 

UT Rio Grande Valley Vaqueros men's basketball seasons
UTRGV